Chenega is a census-designated place (CDP) on Evans Island in the Chugach Census Area in the U.S. state of Alaska. Located in Prince William Sound, the CDP consists of the Chugach Alutiiq village of Chenega Bay, which was established only after the Good Friday earthquake destroyed the original community on Chenega Island to the north. As of the 2020 census, the population of the CDP was 59, largely Alaska Natives; as of 2021, the population of Chenega is estimated at 49. Chenega Bay is in the Chugach School District and has one school, Chenega Bay Community School, serving approximately 16 students from preschool through high school.

History
The original village of Chenega, located on Chenega Island, was destroyed in 1964 by a tsunami from the Good Friday earthquake, which killed a third of the 68 people who then lived there. A post office operated here from 1946-1964. Some residents moved into a refugee camp; others moved to other towns. In 1982, one family moved to Evans Island and between 1984-1991 about 26 other families migrated to the new location, now called Chenega Bay.

Former and current Chenega residents gathered each Good Friday to remember the dead of Chenega. On the 25th Good Friday after the earthquake, in 1989, the oil tanker Exxon Valdez ran aground in Prince William Sound, causing an oil spill that again devastated Chenega and other places around the area economically.

Geography
Chenega is located at  (60.066327, -148.010991).

Demographics

Old Chenega (1880–1964) 
It reported on the 1890 census as "Ingamatsha." 71 of the residents were Native Alaskans and 2 were "Creole" (mixed Russian/Caucasian and Native Alaskan). It returned again in 1900 as Chenega. It did not appear on the 1910 & 1920 censuses. It appeared as "Chanega" in 1930 & 1940 and lastly as Chenega in 1950 and 1960. It was largely destroyed in the Good Friday Earthquake of 1964 and its residents relocated. The old village has not reported on the census since. Some buildings still remain as of 2019.

New Chenega (Chenega Bay) (1990–) 

The new Chenega (or Chenega Bay) first appeared on the 1990 U.S. Census as a census-designated place (CDP). It was founded in 1982 by former residents from the Old Chenega and is located on the east side of Evans Island, named for the old village and island.

As of the census of 2000, there were 86 people, 22 households, and 17 families residing in the CDP. The population density was 3.0 people per square mile (1.2/km2). There were 27 housing units at an average density of 0.9/sq mi (0.4/km2). The racial makeup of the CDP was 22.09% White, 73.26% Native American, and 4.65% from two or more races.

Of the 22 households, 40.9% had children under the age of 18 living with them, 63.6% were married couples living together, 9.1% had a female householder with no husband present, and 18.2% were non-families. 13.6% of all households were made up of individuals, and none had someone living alone who was 65 years of age or older. The average household size was 3.55 and the average family size was 3.83.

In the CDP, the population was spread out, with 33.7% under the age of 18, 7.0% from 18 to 24, 32.6% from 25 to 44, 20.9% from 45 to 64, and 5.8% who were 65 years of age or older. The median age was 30 years. For every 100 females, there were 132.4 males. For every 100 females age 18 and over, there were 119.2 males.

The median income for a household in the CDP was $53,750, and the median income for a family was $58,750. Males had a median income of $75,938 versus $32,500 for females. The per capita income for the CDP was $13,382. There were 16.7% of families and 15.6% of the population living below the poverty line, including no under eighteens and none of those over 64.

References
 Chenega CDP, Alaska United States Census Bureau

Census-designated places in Alaska
Census-designated places in Chugach Census Area, Alaska
Census-designated places in Unorganized Borough, Alaska
Populated coastal places in Alaska on the Pacific Ocean
1982 establishments in Alaska